Ross Murray may refer to:
 Ross Murray (athlete)
 Ross Murray (boxer)
 Ross Murray (golfer)